James Brophy may refer to:

 James Brophy (soldier) (1846–1929), American Medal of Honor recipient
 James Brophy (cricketer) (1912–1994), Irish cricketer
 James Brophy (footballer) (born 1994), English footballer for Leyton Orient
 James Brophy (public servant) (1889–1969), Australian public servant